Woollacott is a surname. Notable people with the surname include:

 Angela Woollacott (born 1955), Australian historian
 Ernest Henry Woollacott (1888–1977), Australian Methodist minister
 Janet Woollacott (1939–2011), British-born French singer
 Richard Woollacott (1977–2018), British horse trainer

See also
 Ben Woollacott (ship)
 Wollacott, surname
 Woolacott, surname